The 2019 season was the 110th season in the history of Sport Club Corinthians Paulista.

Background

Sponsorship
On January 17, Corinthians announced Banco BMG as their new main sponsor.

Kit
 Home (May 2019 onward): White shirt, black shorts and white socks;
 Away (May 2019 onward): Black shirt, white shorts and black socks;
 Third (September 2019 onward): Black and white shirt, black shorts and black socks.

Previous Kits
 Home (Until April 2019): White shirt, black shorts and white socks.
 Away (Until May 2019): Black shirt, white shorts and black socks;
 Third (Until August 2019): Black and gold shirt, black shorts and black socks.

Squad

Managerial changes
On December 3, one day after the 2018 season ended, it was announced that Jair Ventura was fired from the club. Four days later Fábio Carille was announced as the new manager, just seven months after he left to train Saudi club Al-Wehda.

On November 3, 2019, Carille was fired after a loss to Flamengo. The club announced the following day that Dyego Coelho, former player and current U20 manager, would take over as interim until the end of the season.

On November 7, it was announced that Athletico Paranaense's manager Tiago Nunes will be the head coach for the next season.

Transfers

Transfers in

Loans in

Transfers out

Loans out

Squad statistics

Overview

Pre-season and friendlies

Last updated: 5 July 2019Source:

Campeonato Paulista

For the 2019 Campeonato Paulista, the 16 teams are divided in four groups of 4 teams (A, B, C, D). They will face all teams, except those that are in their own group, with the top two teams from each group qualifying for the quarterfinals. The two overall worst teams will be relegated.

First stage

Knockout stages

Sudamericana

Elimination stages

Final stages

Campeonato Brasileiro

Results

Copa do Brasil

Preliminary stages

Knockout stages

See also
List of Sport Club Corinthians Paulista seasons

Notes

References

Sport Club Corinthians Paulista seasons
Corinthians